The 1928 VPI Gobblers football team represented Virginia Polytechnic Institute in the 1928 Southern Conference football season.  The team was led by their head coach Andy Gustafson and finished with a record of seven wins and two losses (7–2).  This was the senior season for the "Pony Express" backfield which included Frank Peake, Herbert McEver, Scotty MacArthur, and Tommy Tomko.

Schedule

Players
The following players were members of the 1928 football team according to the roster published in the 1929 edition of The Bugle, the Virginia Tech yearbook.

References

VPI
Virginia Tech Hokies football seasons
VPI Gobblers football